My Own Jo Ellen the fourth album by Mark Olson and The Original Harmony Ridge Creekdippers, released in October 17, 2000.

Reception

Writing for Allmusic, music critic Jeff Burger wrote of the album; "...the ten wonderful, self-penned songs here are wholly fresh and original, both musically and lyrically. Every cut sounds like an instant classic; and, like the songs of, say, the Band, they seem timeless, as if they've been around for ages... One of the very best albums of 2000, and one destined to be played for years to come."

Track listing
All songs written by Mark Olson.

 "Someone to Talk With" – 4:06
 "Linda Lee" – 4:32
 "Walking Through Nevada" – 3:15
 "Meeting in Lone Pine" – 3:56
 "Diamond Davey" – 3:58
 "Rainbow of Your Heart" – 4:27
 "Ben Johnson's Creek" – 2:54
 "Letter from Africa" – 3:33
 "My Own Jo Ellen" – 2:56
 "Rosalee" – 4:40

Personnel
Mark Olson – vocals, guitar
Danny Frankel – drums, percussion, bongos
Don Heffington – drums, harp
Brian Kane – guitar, clarinet
Greg Leisz – bass, dobro, mandolin, guitar
Barrett Martin – vibraphone
Mike Russell – bass, mandolin, violin
David Williams – background vocals
Victoria Williams – background vocals, electric banjo

Production notes
Produced by Everyone There
Engineered and Mixed by Michael Dumas
Mastered by Joe Gastwirt at Oceanview Digital Mastering

References

2000 albums
Mark Olson (musician) albums
Original Harmony Ridge Creekdippers albums